Subramanian Ramanathan is an electrical engineer at Raytheon BBN Technologies in Cambridge, Massachusetts. He was named a Fellow of the Institute of Electrical and Electronics Engineers (IEEE) in 2012 for his contributions to mobile ad hoc networks using topology control and directional antennas.

References

External links

20th-century births
Living people
Indian electrical engineers
ETH Zurich alumni
Fellow Members of the IEEE
Year of birth missing (living people)
Place of birth missing (living people)